Irakoze Donasiyano (born 3 February 1998) is a professional footballer who plays as a winger for Oakland Roots in the USL Championship. Born in Tanzania, he plays for the Burundi national team.

Career

Youth
Donasiyano played soccer at Patrick Henry High School, scoring 65 goals and tallying 30 assists in 69 games. During his high school career, he was a three-time First Team All-Conference selection, earned back-to-back All-Region and All-State honors in 2016 and 2017, and was named the 2017 Conference 16 and 5A North Region Player of the Year. He also played club soccer with local side Roanoke Star Soccer Club.

College & Amateur
In 2017, Donasiyano attended the University of Virginia to play college soccer. In four seasons with the Cavaliers, included a truncated 2020 season due to the COVID-19 pandemic, Donasiyano made 65 appearances, scoring 5 goals and tallying 8 assists. In 2019, he was named a Third Team All-ACC selection. During his time at college, he played in multiple positions, including as a winger, central midfielder, and as either a fullback or wingback.

Whilst at college, Donasiyano also appeared for USL League Two side Daytona Rush SC during their 2019 season, scoring 2 goals in 8 regular season games.

Professional
On 21 January 2021, Donasiyano was selected 20th overall in the 2021 MLS SuperDraft by Nashville SC. He officially signed with the MLS club on 28 April.

Donasiyano made his professional debut on June 18, 2021, appearing as a 63rd-minute substitute during a 2–0 loss at New York Red Bulls.

On 14 August 2021, Donasiyano joined USL Championship side OKC Energy on loan for the remainder of the season.

Donasiyano was loaned to Phoenix Rising FC on 3 June 2022.

Following the 2022 season, his contract option was declined by Nashville. Donasiyano signed with USL Championship side Oakland Roots on 31 January 2023.

International career
Muyovozi is of Burundian descent, and was called up to the Burundi national team for a set of friendlies in November 2022. He debuted with them in a friendly 4–0 loss to Ivory Coast on 16 November 2022.

Personal
Born in a refugee camp, Muyovozi in the Kigoma Region in Tanzania to a Burundian family, Donasiyano immigrated with his family from Tanzania to the United States in 2007. He became a United States citizen in January 2020.

References

External links
 MLS profile 
 Soccerway profile
 Virginia bio 

1998 births
Living people
People from Kigoma Region
Burundian footballers
Burundi international footballers
American soccer players
Burundian emigrants to the United States
Naturalized citizens of the United States
American people of Burundian descent
Association football midfielders
Nashville SC draft picks
Nashville SC players
Major League Soccer players
OKC Energy FC players
Phoenix Rising FC players
Oakland Roots SC players
USL League Two players
Virginia Cavaliers men's soccer players
Burundian expatriate footballers
Burundian expatriates in the United States
Expatriate soccer players in the United States